Aquiles David Ocanto Querales (born 18 November 1988) is a Venezuelan footballer striker who currently plays for Monagas.

References

External links 
 
 
 

1988 births
Living people
Sportspeople from Barquisimeto
Venezuelan footballers
Venezuelan expatriate footballers
Venezuela international footballers
Asociación Civil Deportivo Lara players
Esporte Clube Juventude players
Carabobo F.C. players
Deportivo Táchira F.C. players
Deportivo La Guaira players
Venezuelan Primera División players
Association football forwards
Expatriate footballers in Brazil
Venezuelan expatriate sportspeople in Brazil